San José del Castillo is a small pueblo in Jalisco, Mexico near the city of Guadalajara. It is known for its festivals on March 11 to 19 celebrating our lord San Jose. 

Populated places in Jalisco